First-seeded Rod Laver won the men's singles title at the 1972 United Bank Classic tennis tournament.

Seeds

Draw

Finals

Top half

Bottom half

References

External links
 ITF tournament edition details

Tennis in Colorado
1972 World Championship Tennis circuit